The Australian spotted catshark (Asymbolus analis) is a catshark of the family Scyliorhinidae, found only around Australia between 32 and 38°S, at depths between 10 and 180 m. It can grow up to 90 cm. Females of this species were observed as being reproductive year round. They are also confirmed as being a single oviparous species.

References

 

Australian spotted catshark
Marine fish of Eastern Australia
Taxa named by James Douglas Ogilby
Australian spotted catshark